David John McIvor (born 29 June 1964 in Kirkcaldy, Scotland) is a Scottish rugby coach who won six caps for Scotland playing as a flanker.

Rugby Union career

Amateur career
McIvor began his rugby career with  Glenrothes. He moved to Edinburgh Academicals in 1988.

In 1996, he moved back to play for Glenrothes.

Provincial and professional career

He captained North and Midlands in 1996 and played in the Scottish Inter-District Championship. When the North and Midlands side turned professional in 1996 he then played for Caledonia Reds.

He won the 1996–97 Scottish Inter-District Championship with Caledonia Reds, their first outright Inter-District title in their history.

International career

His debut for Scotland was at Murrayfield against England on 18 January 1992. His last international appearance was at Murrayfield against South Africa on 19 November 1994.

He made five appearances for Barbarians FC between 1993 and 1996.

Coaching career

He was a coach at Edinburgh Academicals. He became president of Edinburgh Academicals in 2015.

References

1964 births
Living people
Scottish rugby union players
Scotland international rugby union players
Edinburgh Academicals rugby union players
Scottish rugby union coaches
Caledonia Reds players
North and Midlands players
Barbarian F.C. players
Glenrothes RFC players
Rugby union flankers
Rugby union players from Kirkcaldy